Victor "Vic" Niblett (9 December 1924 in Frimley – 2004) was an English professional footballer. His clubs included Reading,  West Ham United and Gillingham, where he made over 150 Football League appearances.

References

1924 births
2004 deaths
English footballers
Gillingham F.C. players
West Ham United F.C. players
Reading F.C. players
Association football defenders